Sorority Life was a reality television show on MTV that aired from June 24, 2002, to November 19, 2003. The show consisted of girls pledging to become part of a sorority.

Production
The first season occurred at University of California, Davis.  It followed 6 girls over 10 weeks as they pledged Sigma Alpha Epsilon Pi, a 4-year-old Jewish sorority that was relatively unknown on campus at the time.

The second season occurred at University at Buffalo.  It followed 6 girls pledging for the Delta Xi Omega sorority.

The third season occurred  at the University of Southern California.  It followed girls pledging Zeta Sigma Phi, an independent multicultural sorority on campus founded in 1994.

Reception
Sorority Life as a whole has been reviewed by Citynet Magazine, with the reviewer noting the differences between the reality of sororities and the image that MTV was projecting in the series. Citynet commented that MTV seemed "to think that bringing out the sorority stereotypes is going to boost ratings. Maybe they’re right, maybe not. Either way, I’m not overly impressed." The magazine also noted that sororities with similar names to those in the show were also receiving hate mail from viewers. Multiple sororities have come forward about the show, decrying the show's depiction of sorority life and politics.

Spin-offs
Fraternity Life was a spin-off of Sorority Life that was filmed at fraternities at the same college as the sororities during the second and third season.

References

External links
 
 

MTV reality television series
2002 American television series debuts
2003 American television series endings
2000s American reality television series
Women in California
University of California, Davis